Igoris Pankratjevas (born 9 August 1964) is a Lithuanian professional football coach and a former player. He made his debut in the Soviet Top League in 1983 for FK Žalgiris Vilnius.

Igoris Pankratjevas coached several top Lithuanian football clubs. In 2010 season he was voted best coach of the year after winning bronze medals with a promoted FK Žalgiris Vilnius side. Appointed Lithuania assistant coach in March 2012, before taking over as caretaker in September 2013 and then giving a permanent head coach role on 21 December 2013. He then resigned as Lithuania head coach after a 0–3 loss to England on 12 October 2015.

Honours

Player
 Soviet First League (second tier) gold: 1982
 Soviet Top League bronze: 1987
 Lithuanian LFF CUP winner: 1992
 Ukrainian Premier League runner-up: 1992
 Ukrainian Premier League champion: 1993

Coach
 Lithuanian A League bronze: 2003 (FK Atlantas)
 Lithuanian LFF Cup winner: 2003 (FK Atlantas)
 Lithuanian A League silver: 2005 (FBK Kaunas)
 Lithuanian LFF Cup winner: 2005 (FBK Kaunas)
 Lithuanian A League bronze: 2010 (VMFD Žalgiris)
 Best Coach of the year: 2010

European club competitions(as a player)
 UEFA Cup 1988–89 with FK Žalgiris Vilnius: 2 games
 UEFA Cup 1991–92 with FC Dynamo Moscow: 3 games

European club competitions(as a coach)

2004–05 Spartak Moskva – FK Atlantas 2 – 0 Intertoto / 1st round

2004–05 FK Atlantas – Spartak Moskva 1 – 0 Intertoto / 1st round

2008–09 FK Suduva – TNS 1–0 UEFA Cup / 1st round

2008–09 TNS – FK Suduva 0–1 UEFA Cup / 1st round

2008–09 FK Suduva – Red Bull Salzburg 1–4 UEFA Cup / 2nd round

2008–09 Red Bull Salzburg – FK Suduva UEFA Cup 0–1 / 2nd round

Managerial statistics

References

1964 births
Living people
Soviet footballers
Lithuanian footballers
Lithuania international footballers
Lithuanian expatriate footballers
FK Žalgiris players
KSV Hessen Kassel players
FC Dynamo Moscow players
FC Dynamo Kyiv players
FC Zorya Luhansk players
FC Nyva Ternopil players
Soviet Top League players
Soviet First League players
Ukrainian Premier League players
Lithuanian football managers
Lithuanian expatriate football managers
Expatriate footballers in Ukraine
SC Westfalia Herne players
FBK Kaunas managers
FK Standard Sumgayit managers
FK Žalgiris managers
FK Atlantas managers
FK Sūduva Marijampolė managers
Lithuania national football team managers
Expatriate football managers in Azerbaijan
Lithuanian expatriate sportspeople in Ukraine
Lithuanian expatriate sportspeople in Azerbaijan
FK Kareda Kaunas players
Lithuanian people of Russian descent
Association football defenders
Association football midfielders